Sacred Heart Pioneers ice hockey may refer to either of the ice hockey teams that represent Sacred Heart University:

Sacred Heart Pioneers men's ice hockey
Sacred Heart Pioneers women's ice hockey